Adelchis, also spelled Adelgis or Adalgis (Adelgiso), is a masculine Germanic given name used among the Lombards. It may refer to:
Adalgis (died 788), son of the king of Italy
Adelchis of Benevento, reigned as prince 854–78
Adelchis I of Spoleto, reigned as duke 824–34

See also
Adelchi (disambiguation)
Adalgisa (disambiguation)

Masculine given names